Montrose is a town and former royal burgh in Angus, Scotland. It is the northernmost coastal town in Angus and developed as a natural harbour that traded in skins, hides, and cured salmon in medieval times.

With a population of approximately 12,000, the town functions as a port, but the major employer is GlaxoSmithKline, which was saved from closure in 2006. The skyline of Montrose is dominated by the  steeple of Old and St Andrew's Church, designed by James Gillespie Graham and built between 1832 and 1834.

Montrose is a town with a wealth of architecture, and is a centre for international trade. It is an important commercial port for the oil and gas industry. It is known for its wide thoroughfare and high street, which
leads to picturesque closes containing secluded gardens. The town has a view of a tidal lagoon, Montrose Basin, which is considered a nature reserve of international importance. It is the largest inland salt water basin in the UK, and an important habitat for the mute swan. Just outside Montrose is the 18th-century House of Dun, designed by the Scottish architect William Adam and built in 1730 for David Erskine, Lord Dun, 13th Laird of Dun.

History

Toponymy and early history

Prehistoric elements are found in the vicinity of Montrose, including the Stone of Morphie located to the north. One ancient name for Montrose was Celurca. The place-name is formed from the Scottish Gaelic Monadh (meaning moor) and Ros (meaning peninsula or promontory), perhaps ultimately of Pictish origin. The first documentary evidence of the existence of Montrose is the burgh charter issued by David I who founded the town around 1140 as Sallorch or Sallork. By 1178 the name had taken the form Munross before becoming Montrose. Folk etymology attributes the origin of the town's name as "Mount of Roses". This is reflected by the motto on the town's seal: Mare ditat, rosa decorat. (English: The sea enriches, the rose adorns)

Medieval history
Montrose was visited and plundered in numerous instances by Danes. In the year 980 it was sacked and razed to the ground. It was once believed that a castle existed in Montrose in the 10th century and was destroyed by Kenneth III. However the historicity of this account has been disputed.

In the two proceeding centuries there are no precise dates in its history. During the 1140s it was an important trading town. The trading revenues received from Montrose as well as Forfar and Dundee were acquired by Malcolm IV and contributed to Restenneth Priory. In 1178 William the Lion built a castle nearby in which he would occasionally reside. The ruins have acquired the name Red Castle. The last record of a charter there was in 1198. A convent dedicated to the Virgin Mary is said to have been founded in 1230 by Alan Durward but the precise location is unknown. In 1244 the town succumbed to fire.

In July 1296 during the Wars of Independence, Edward I visited the town with 30,000 of his men and stayed at Munros castle for three nights. Some accounts state that it was there that he humiliated Scottish King John de Balliol by publicly stripping him of his royal insignia and status; other accounts claim that this occurred in Brechin. Twelve burgesses of the town swore allegiance to Edward I to protect themselves and the community of the town. The following year the castle, which was manned by an English garrison, was destroyed by William Wallace who is said to have slain all soldiers in sight. The site of the castle, known as Castlestead, is at the southern end of the High Street. David II visited it towards the end of his reign in 1371. The Dukedom of Montrose was created in 1488.

During the 15th century, the inhabitants of the town found themselves increasingly under heel of the Lairds of Dun who ransacked and took possession of property and cattle. The lairds are said to have arrived in the middle of one night on horseback heavily armed. The burghesses of the town immediately sent out an appeal to the Duke of Montrose for protection but the messenger was purportedly murdered before the appeal arrived. It was then that James IV of Scotland intervened and settled the matter.

Modern history

From its early inception as a port Montrose had traded in skins, hides and cured salmon but in the 17th century began to export wheat and barley in regular trading transactions with the Hanseatic League. The town imported flax and timber from the Baltic; salt, fruit and wine from France and Portugal. The wealth this brought to the town is demonstrated in the surviving houses built by landowning and merchant families as well as local street names of "America Street", "California Street", "Baltic Street" and "India Street" evidencing its trading heritage.

The site of the castle, now known as Castlestead was the birthplace of the famous James Graham, 1st Marquess of Montrose. Graham signed the National Covenant against Charles I's reorganisation of the Kirk in Scotland, fighting in the ensuing Bishops' Wars, but later switched to the King's side only to be captured and executed in Edinburgh in the year 1650.

The final chapter of the ill-fated 1715 Jacobite rebellion was also played out in Montrose. Towards the end of the uprising (which had lasted nearly six months, from September 1715 to February 1716) James Francis Edward Stuart (the Old Pretender; formerly James, Prince of Wales) arrived in Montrose, where he spent his last night in Scotland, on 4 February 1716. He sailed from Montrose to exile in France. The town was held for his son, Charles Edward Stuart (Bonnie Prince Charlie; the Young Pretender), 30 years later and in February 1746 the largest naval battle of the war was fought in Montrose Harbour.

During the 18th century the town was a major smuggling centre. It profited from the slave trade but only for a brief time. The wealth accrued by trade was substantial. Wealthy merchants in the 18th and 19th centuries dominated the town and built their houses gable to gable. Hence Montrosians have inherited the sobriquet, "gable-enders". A statistical account taken between 1791 and 1799 estimates the population in the 1750s as 4248; in 1776 as 4465; in 1784 as 4866 and in 1790 as 5194. Contemporaries expected that many would emigrate at the conclusion of the American Revolutionary War but those that did leave were few.

Samuel Johnson made a tour of the town on his visit to Scotland in the 1770s. He said of it:

"...we travelled on to Montrose, which we surveyed in the morning and found it well-built, airy, and clean. The town house is a handsome fabrick with a portico. We then went to view the English chapel, and found it a small church, clean to a degree unknown in any other part of Scotland, with commodious galleries, and what was yet less expected, with an organ.". 

 Alexander Christie (c. 1721–1794) was provost in the town during the 1760s and 1780s and oversaw the establishment of Scotland's first Lunatic Asylum in Montrose in 1781 which eventually became known as Sunnyside Royal Hospital. The Asylum, initially called Montrose Lunatic Asylum, Infirmary and Dispensary was founded by Susan Carnegie of Charleton to treat both paupers and private patients and was originally situated on Montrose Links. It was granted a Royal Charter in 1810. In 1858 it moved to Sunnyside farm at the nearby village of Hillside. Its facilities were expanded several in the next few decades and it underwent various changes in name, finally becoming Sunnyside Royal Hospital in 1962. Sunnyside remained in use for the treatment of people with mental illnesses until its final closure in 2011 when many of its patients and functions moved to the Susan Carnegie Centre at Stracathro Hospital.

In 1785 a subscription library for learned men was formed.

Before World War I the Royal Flying Corps established a base at Montrose (later RAF Montrose). On 26 February 1913, it became the first operational military aerodrome to be established in the United Kingdom.

Between the wars, Montrose was a focus for key figures of the Scottish Renaissance.  In 1920, a young Christopher Murray Grieve (later Hugh MacDiarmid) was employed as a reporter on the Montrose Review.  By 1922 he had been elected as an Independent Labour Party councillor.  The poet and novelist Violet Jacob was brought up at the nearby House of Dun and spent time in Angus during the 'twenties.  The sculptor William Lamb was born in Montrose and returned to the town in 1924.

Another native of Montrose, the writer Tom MacDonald (Fionn MacColla) returned to Montrose in 1929, as did his friend the painter Edward Baird. Willa and Edwin Muir lived at her mother's house in Montrose at various times during the 1920s. The poet Helen Cruickshank attended Montrose Academy, though she had moved to Edinburgh by the 1920s.  She was a key figure in maintaining the network of contacts between writers and artists of Scotland's inter-war cultural renaissance.

During World War II Montrose became a hub for a constant stream of international pilots from all over the Commonwealth, Poland, Czechoslovakia, America, Russia, France and other allied nations. As well as a training base RAF Montrose was also an operational airfield for Hawker Hurricane and Supermarine Spitfire squadrons, which flew sorties over Norway and were a part of the air defences for Edinburgh. Of course, this also made the town a target for German aircraft and it was bombed on more than one occasion. Despite its coastal location presenting a danger however, large numbers of children and young mothers from Dundee were evacuated there during the period of the Phoney War. Initially numbers totalled around 2,000 but in a second wave around 1,200 more were sent. As was the case in many other receiving areas, the local population was concerned by the condition of the urban poor and impetigo and vermin were found on some of those evacuated. By June 1940 Montrose could no longer provide shelter.

Montrose was a royal burgh until 1975.

Bamse

Bamse (meaning 'teddybear' in Norwegian), a St Bernard dog famed for his exploits and popular in local imagination, is buried in the town. Bamse the Norwegian Sea Dog arrived in Montrose on the Royal Norwegian Navy minesweeper Thorodd during World War II with Captain Erling Hafto, his owner, who registered him as a crew member. He saved the life of Lieutenant Commander Olav Nilsen at Dundee Docks and generally protected his fellow sailors. On his death in July 1944 Montrose schools were closed and 800 children lined the route to his graveside funeral.

The Bamse Project raised £50,000 to erect a larger than life-size bronze statue of Bamse at Montrose Harbour.  Half the donations came from Norway. The statue was created by internationally known sculptor Alan Herriot, and was unveiled by The Duke of York in October 2007.

Governance

Montrose is represented within Angus Council by the Montrose & District Ward, from which four councillors are elected. The members elected from this ward are, as of 2022: Bill Duff (Scottish National Party), Tommy Stewart (Independent), Kenny Braes (Scottish National Party) and Iain Gall (Conservative).

The town is part of the Angus constituency of the Parliament of the United Kingdom which returns a Member of Parliament (MP) to the House of Commons, at Westminster. The constituency's MP is Dave Doogan of the Scottish National Party who has been the MP since 2019.

Montrose is also part of the Angus North and Mearns constituency of the Scottish Parliament that elects a single MSP and also part of the North East Scotland electoral region which elects seven additional Members of the Scottish Parliament. The constituency's MSP is currently Mairi Gougeon of the Scottish National Party who was first elected in 2016 as Mairi Evans.

Geography and natural features

Montrose occupies a position on the North Bank of Montrose Basin at the mouth of the River South Esk on the East Coast of Scotland,  NNE of Arbroath,  SW of Stonehaven, and  ESE of Brechin. The town lies  NNE of Edinburgh, and  NNW of London. The land is relatively flat, rising gradually to around 15m elevation to the North of the town.

The expanse of the town extends to the villages on its fringes; Hillside and Ferryden. It lies close to the hamlets of Lunan and St Cyrus. The rural location ensures that the air quality is good, with low levels of nitrogen dioxide and PM10.

Montrose Basin

The Montrose Basin is a shallow estuary approximately three miles in diameter. It is situated where the River South Esk meets the North Sea. During the 16th century, local landowners desiring more arable land considered reducing its size, but their plans were never carried out.

In 1981 the Montrose Basin Nature Reserve was created. The Scottish Wildlife Trust operates a modern, purpose-built wildlife centre at Rossie Braes, which offers good telescopic and televisual views of the area, and of the thousands of migratory birds which pass through the area in all seasons.

In summer, one might see the osprey which hunts along the length of the Basin, or a kingfisher flitting past. The artificial sand martin bank is a hive of activity all spring and early summer. One can watch the blue tits and barn swallows inside their nests, and take in the panoramic vista of the rolling Angus countryside and hills.

In October and November there are 38,000 birds using the basin. In winter, 20,000 pink-footed geese take up residence on the mudflats, feeding in the nearby fields by day, and returning to the safety of the Basin in the evening. The haunting fluting of their calls are beloved of local people, for whom the sound marks the turning of the seasons. The many feeders attract brightly coloured field and garden birds, and the occasional woodpecker.

In recent years research published by Scottish Natural Heritage claimed that the population of greylag geese has fallen as a result of climate change.

Montrose Beach

The  sandy beach has been awarded a Blue Flag for its eco credentials. The surrounding Traill Pavilion and Seafront Splash! facilities with an arcade, a playground, a café and an ice-cream stall is popular amongst locals and visitors alike. North of the town the River North Esk enters the North Sea across the beach.

The Save our Sands Campaign (SOS) was set up on 26 March 2009 to raise awareness amidst concerns over the erosion of Montrose beach, caused by the "one million tonnes of sand, swept by the tide into the harbour...removed from the local area over the past 25 years". In 2006 150,000 tonnes was shipped to Aberdeen to fortify its dwindling beach. This was met with opposition from Montrose Golf Links who believed that the golf course built on top of the dunes, as one of the oldest in the world, should be protected. The sand dunes are becoming unstable due to increasing tides which has forced the Montrose Golf Links to consider moving elements of the golf course more inland.  A major scheme of engineered coastal protection was discouraged by Scottish Natural Heritage on the grounds that it would be unsustainable and could impact a protected coastal site at St Cyrus.

A film made by local broadcaster Anthony Baxter in January 2009 highlighted the issue and was designed to attract attention for urgent action and put pressure on local politicians. The group are concerned that Angus Council are not acting efficiently to halt the effects of erosion and believe a full study should be carried out. The film won the best short film category in the BFFS Community Cinema Festival in 2009. Since 2009 a team from the University of Dundee has begun assessing the coastline around Montrose in a two-year study to decide the best way of managing coastal erosion. The film titled "SOS Montrose Dredging" has been posted on YouTube.

Demography
The 2001 census gave Montrose's total resident population as 10,845. This makes it the third largest town in Angus, after Arbroath (22,785) and Forfar (14,048) with Carnoustie in fourth place (10,561).

Since the Second World War the population of Montrose has increased. The presence of Dundee families in Montrose during wartime convinced a number to settle there. This altered the demographics of the town and led to the building of housing estates in the 1960s. A number of people from the Polish community who had served with the British forces at RAF Montrose also settled.

There is an increasing elderly population which is reflected in the profusion of nursing and residential homes and in recent plans to extend provision for sheltered housing. Data published by Scottish Neighbourhood Statistics in 2008 records the population of Montrose & District as 15,013 which is around 18% of the population of Angus as a whole. Of this total 17.6% are children, 60% are of working age and 22% are pensioners. Around 12% of those who live in the town are unemployed and 14.1% of households are "income deprived".

Education

Schools include six primary schools, Lochside, Ferryden, Southesk, Rosemount, Borrowfield and St Margarets, and one secondary school Montrose Academy.

Economy

The economy of the town has been expanding since the end of the Second World War. GlaxoSmithKline has been a major source of jobs since the 1950s. Other significant employers include Tesco, Cooperative Group, Petrofac, National Oilwell Varco, Baker Hughes and Argos. The Lochside Distillery, located on Brechin Road north of the town centre, was closed down in the 1990s and the buildings demolished in 2005 after a fire. In 2009 Sainsbury's announced plans to build a new superstore on the edge of the town which was to provide work for an estimated 200 people. Construction of the new Sainsburys store was approved by Angus Council in August 2011 and spokespersons from Sainsburys believed at the time that the store would open in less than a year, unfortunately Sainsburys cancelled these plans and 4 commercial units were built on the site in 2018. BT initially upgraded the local telephone exchange to grant the town access to super fast fiberoptic broadband services one of only three towns to be chosen in Scotland. The average price of housing in the town is between £106,054 and £131,539, a rise on the 1998 average between £42,640 and £51,200.

Tourism
Since 2002 there has been a focus on attracting new visitors to the town with the foundation of the Montrose Town Partnership which aims to "encourage representatives of the public, private and community sector to act together to develop the economic potential of Montrose to address the needs of local people and visitors alike". Membership includes The Montrose Society, Montrose Heritage Trust, Montrose Community Council, Montrose Golf Links Ltd, MERPRO Leisure, Montrose Business and Retailers Association, Scottish Wildlife Trust, Angus Council, Ferryden & Craig and Hillside, Dun and Logie Pert community councils. Since 2002 they have produced a number of promotional leaflets and have established a weekly Saturday market in the town centre. In 2002 plans were unveiled to renovate the Mid Links. The project was completed in 2003 at the total cost of £1.8million with £1.2million granted by the Heritage Lottery Fund. Plaques have been incorporated to inform visitors of the historical heritage of the town's buildings.

Culture

Cultural history

Montrose is regarded as the culture and sculpture capital of Angus, with over 20 statues of note scattered around the town. They are a mix of contemporary and classical works, with many by the local sculptor, William Lamb ARSA, an artist of exceptional talent.  From the 1920s to 1940s, local architect George Fairweather's studio provided a forum for lively debate by an artistic community that included Hugh MacDiarmid, Edwin Muir, William Lamb, Helen Cruickshank and Fionn MacColla.  The local weekly newspaper, the Montrose Review, was edited by MacDiarmid.

Music
Since 2008, Montrose has hosted the Montrose Music Festival or Mo Fest as it has affectionately become known, which takes place each year at the end of May. It has grown in size and stature each year to become Scotland's biggest free live music festival with over 200 free gigs played over the three days in over 26 venues across the town, including an open-air stage on Montrose's historic High street with the dominating Montrose Steeple behind the stage which draws crowds of all ages from all over the country.

In 2014 the MoFest team took a leap and hosted a gig on Montrose East Links to 5000 revelers on the Friday night which kicked off the 7th annual festival with rock legends Status Quo playing to the sell-out crowd. Other Notable Headliners who have played at the festival include Average White Band, Deacon Blue, The Proclaimers, Ocean Colour Scene, Toploader, Eddi Reader, Bryan Adams, The Beach Boys & Madness.

Sport
Montrose is also a qualifying course for The Open Championship. Past events hosted on the Montrose Links include:
Scottish Professional Championship, 1909, 1967, 1970
Scottish Amateur Championship, 1905, 1913, 1919, 1926 and 1925
British Boys Championship, 1991; Scottish Universities Championship
Final Qualifying for The Open, 1999 and 2007.

Links Park is home to three football teams:

 A senior side, Montrose F.C., who are members of the Scottish Football League and currently play in League One.
 A junior side, Montrose Roselea F.C., who play in the sixth tier of Scottish football.
 A women's side, Montrose W.F.C., who play in the SWPL 2.
Other sports associations include the Montrose Cricket Club, Montrose Tennis Club, Montrose & District SEALS Swimming Club, Montrose & District Athletics, Montrose and District rugby union club, Montrose Sailing Club (dinghy sailing on the Basin) and several bowls clubs which are part of the Montrose & District Bowling Club Association.

Helen Matthews a suffragette and women's footballer was born in Montrose. She created the first-ever women's football team. This team beat England 3–1 in their second match in May 1881.

Religious sites

Christian groups
There are many churches in Montrose. Three belong to the Church of Scotland: Montrose Old and St Andrew's ('Auld Kirk'), Montrose: South and Ferryden, Dun and Hillside Church. There are two United Free Churches: Knox's Church and Ferryden Church. Grace Church Montrose is a new church plant belonging to the Free Church of Scotland. In the Links, there is an Episcopal Church (St Mary's and St Peter's); the United Reformed Church and Methodist Church are nearby. A Quaker group meets in the town. The Roman Catholic community is served by St Margaret's Roman Catholic Church. There is also a Baptist Church situated in Borrowfield.

The most prominent church is the Old and St Andrew's Church, Montrose. Reverend Dr Charles Nisbet who became minister in 1764 described it as a church which "embraced much cultivation and intelligence".

Other groups
In Borrowfield there is a LDS Church and a Kingdom Hall of Jehovah's Witnesses lies on the edge of the town.

Transportation
The town is served by Montrose railway station. The X7 Coastrider bus route between Aberdeen and Perth runs through the town.

Public services
Montrose and the surrounding area is supplied with water by Scottish Water from the Lintrathen and Backwater reservoirs in Glen Isla. Electricity distribution is by Scottish Hydro Electric plc, part of the Scottish and Southern Energy group.

Waste management is handled by Angus Council. There is a kerbside recycling scheme that has been in operation since March 2005. Cans, glass, paper and plastic bottles are collected on a weekly basis. Compostable material and non-recyclable material are collected on alternate weeks. Roughly two-thirds of non-recyclable material is sent to landfill at Angus Council's site at Lochhead, Forfar and the remainder sent for incineration (with energy recovery) outside the council area.

A recycling centre is located at Broomfield Road. Items accepted include, steel and aluminium cans, cardboard, paper, electrical equipment, engine oil, fridges and freezers, garden waste, gas bottles, glass, liquid food and drinks cartons, plastic bottles, plastic carrier bags, rubble, scrap metal, shoes and handbags, spectacles, textiles, tin foil, wood and yellow pages. Angus council publishes details of where and how each product is processed. There are also glass banks at Tesco in Western Road and Scotmid in New Wynd, as well as a neighbourhood recycling point at Wharf Street. The Angus Council area had a recycling rate of 34.7% in 2007/08.

Healthcare is supplied in the area by NHS Tayside. The nearest hospital with accident and emergency departments is Ninewells Hospital, Dundee. Primary Health Care in Montrose is supplied by Castlegait Surgery, Townhead Practice and Annatbank Practice which are based at the Links Health Centre. Montrose along with the rest of Scotland is served by the Scottish Ambulance Service. Montrose Royal Infirmary, which had served as a community hospital, closed in April 2018.

Law enforcement is provided by Police Scotland, and Montrose is served by Tayside Fire and Rescue Service.

Notable people
Ernie Copland (1924-1971), Scottish footballer who played for Arbroath, Dundee and Raith Rovers. He was selected for Scotland's 1954 FIFA World Cupsquad, but did not travel to the finals and never actually played for the national side.
 Robert Brown FRSE FRS FLS MWS (1773–1858), famous Scottish botanist, who discovered Brownian motion.
 James Brown (1734–1791), Scottish clergyman of the Scottish Episcopal Church. Held allegiance to the House of Stuart before and after 1788. Jacobite. Father of botanist Robert Brown FRSE FRS FLS MWS.
 Alexander Allan (1809–1891), locomotive engineer. Invented the balanced slide valve, & the straight-link valve gear.
 Edward Baird (1904–1949), artist.
 Captain Sir Alexander Burnes FRS (1805–1841), explorer.
 Charles Burgess (1873-1961), Scottish professional golfer and footballer.
 David Carnegie (1772–1837), entrepreneur & banker. Founded Carnegie Investment Bank.
 George Paul Chalmers RSA (1833–1878), Scottish landscape, seascape, portrait and interior painter.
 Helen Cruickshank (1886–1975), Scottish poet.
 Henry Renny-Tailyour (1849–1920), sportsman representing Scotland in some of the earliest international football and rugby union matches. Born in India, he spent his childhood on the family estate at Newmanswalls.
 James Taylor (1948-), American multi-Grammy Award winning singer-songwriter and guitarist is a descendent of the Tailyour family of Montrose.
 Malcolm Duncan (1945–2019), Scottish tenor saxophonist and founding member of the Average White Band.
 James Graham, 1st Marquis of Montrose (1612–1650), Scottish poet, soldier, lord lieutenant and later viceroy and captain general of Scotland.
 Joseph Hume FRS (1777–1855), Scottish doctor and politician.
 Allan Octavian Hume CB ICS (1829–1912), a political reformer, ornithologist and botanist who worked in British India. He has been called "the Father of Indian Ornithology".
 William Lamb RSA (1893–1951), Scottish sculptor and artist.
 Violet Jacob (1863–1946), Scottish writer & poet, known especially for her historical novel Flemington. Born into House of Dun.
 David Erskine, Lord Dun (1670–1758), 13th Laird of Dun, Scottish advocate, judge and commissioner to the Scottish parliament. Commissioned William Adam to build House of Dun. Opposed the Union.
 John Erskine of Dun (1509–1591), Laird of Dun, Scottish religious reformer.
 John Ewen (1741–1821), songwriter.
 David Luckie (1827–1909), journalist and politician
 Fionn MacColla (1906–1975), Scottish novelist closely connected to the Scottish Renaissance. Founding member of the National Party of Scotland in 1928.
 Hugh MacDiarmid (1892–1978), poet, and sometime editor and reporter of local newspaper, the Montrose Review. Considered a principal force in the Scottish Renaissance. Founding member of the National Party of Scotland in 1928.
 John McGovern (1949 –), Scottish football player and manager. Captained Nottingham Forest side that won the European Cup twice.
 Andrew Melville (1545–1622), Scottish scholar, theologian, poet and religious reformer. Participated in Knox's reformation in Scotland.
 James Morrison RSA, RSW (1932 – 2020), artist.
Willa Muir (1890 – 1970), Montrose-born feminist novelist, academic and pioneering translator into English of major works by Franz Kafka.
 William Barclay Peat (1852–1936), accountant, a founder of KPMG.
 Hercules Ross (1745–1816), merchant and abolitionist.
 Horatio Ross (1801–1886), sportsman, photographer & politician. Son of Hercules Ross.
 Commander E. C. Shankland FRSE (1880–1951), Scottish naval officer and harbour expert.
 Gordon Smith (1924–2004), Scottish footballer. Only player to have won a Scottish league championship with three clubs. 
 George Wishart (1513–1546), Scottish Protestant reformer.
 Helen Matthews (1857/8 – ?), Scottish suffragette and women's footballer. Created the first ever women's football team. This team beat England 3–1 in their second match ever in May 1881.
 John Taylor (1816–1881), Scottish merchant and politician in Nova Scotia.
 James Strachan (1810–1875), merchant, grazier and politician in Victoria, Australia.
 John Clerk of Pennycuik (1611–1674), Scottish merchant who maintained a comprehensive archive of family papers, now held by the National Archives of Scotland and the National Library of Scotland.

Twin towns
  – Luzarches, France - Montrose has been twinned with Luzarches since 1994.

Legacy
The town gives its name to the neighbourhood of Montrose in Houston, United States.

In J.K. Rowling's Harry Potter universe, there is a professional Quidditch team from the township of Montrose; The Montrose Magpies.

Two Royal Navy ships have been named  after the Duke of Montrose.

See also
 RAF Montrose
 House of Dun
 List of Provosts of Montrose
 Montrose Air Station Heritage Centre

Notes

References

Further reading
 Norman Keir Atkinson, The Early History of Montrose, (Angus Council Cultural Services, 1997) 
 James Bowick, John Lee et al., Montrose Characters: Past and Present, (Montrose, 1881)
 Duncan Fraser, Montrose (before 1700), (Montrose: Standard Press, 1967)
 Duncan Fraser, The Smugglers, (Montrose: Standard Press, 1971)
 Gordon Jackson & S.G.E. Lythe (eds), The Port of Montrose, (Tayport: Hutton, 1993) 
 James G. Low, Industry in Montrose, (Monikie: Pitnolen Publications, 1994)
 W. A. McNeil, Montrose before 1700 from original documents, (Dundee: Abertay Historical Society, 1961)
 David Mitchell, The History of Montrose, (Montrose: Geo. Walker, 1866)
 Tom Valentine, Old Montrose, (Catrine: Stenlake, 1997)

External links
 Old maps of Montrose (1693–1861)
 History of Montrose by Angus Council
 Montrose Natural History and Antiquarian Society
 Visit Montrose

 
Towns in Angus, Scotland
Royal burghs
Ports and harbours of Scotland
Port cities and towns of the North Sea
Populated coastal places in Scotland